The Police (Scotland) Act 1967 (c. 77) is an Act of the United Kingdom Parliament which until 2013 had provided a framework for territorial police forces in Scotland to operate within. The Police and Fire Reform (Scotland) Act 2012, passed by the Scottish Parliament set out arrangements for organisations to replace those set out in the 1967 Act.

The 1967 Act did not generally apply to any police force operating in Scotland whose jurisdiction is not defined by either local authority boundaries or by the national boundary of Scotland; certain individual sections deal with the necessary exercise of some police powers by specified non-Scottish or all-United Kingdom forces.

All Justice matters are devolved to the Scottish Government under the Scotland Act 1998, however, and Scotland has (and always has had) its own civil and criminal legal systems quite separate and distinct from those in England and Wales.

The Act lead to the repeal of Police (Scotland) Act 1956 with the exception of s.37. This act also repealed the whole of Police (Scotland) Act 1966.

Preamble
"An Act to consolidate certain enactments relating to police forces in Scotland and to the execution of warrants in the border counties of England and Scotland and to repeal certain provisions relating to the police in Scotland which have ceased to have any effect."

Section 41
See Assaulting a constable in the execution of his duty.

References

External links
 

1967 in Scotland
Acts of the Parliament of the United Kingdom concerning Scotland
Law enforcement in Scotland
United Kingdom Acts of Parliament 1967
Police legislation in the United Kingdom